CP-615,003 is a drug which acts as a subtype-selective partial agonist at GABAA receptors, and was developed by Pfizer as a potential anxiolytic; however, poor blood–brain barrier penetration make it primarily useful as a research ligand.

References

Anxiolytics
Pfizer brands
GABAA receptor positive allosteric modulators
Peripherally selective drugs